Sri Lanka bulbul may refer to:

 a subspecies of the square-tailed bulbul found in Sri Lanka 
 Yellow-eared bulbul, a species of bird found in Sri Lanka

Birds by common name